Uresiphita is a genus of moths of the family Crambidae.

Species
Uresiphita gilvata (Fabricius, 1794)
Uresiphita insulicola
Uresiphita mongolicalis (Caradja, 1916)
Uresiphita ornithopteralis (Guenée, 1854)
Uresiphita polygonalis (Denis & Schiffermueller, 1775)
Uresiphita reversalis (Guenée, 1854)

Former species
Uresiphita catalalis (Viette, 1953)
Uresiphita maorialis (C. Felder, R. Felder & Rogenhofer, 1875)

References

Crambidae genus list at Butterflies and Moths of the World of the Natural History Museum

External links
 
 

Pyraustinae
Crambidae genera
Taxa named by Jacob Hübner